Miss & Mrs. Cops (lit. Girl Cops, 걸캅스) is a 2019 South Korean crime comedy film starring Ra Mi-ran and Lee Sung-kyung. It was released on May 9, 2019.

The original title Girl Cops  is an homage to the South Korean television series Two Cops (1993).

Plot
Mi-yeong is a former police squad officer who starts working at the Public Service Center after her marriage. Ji-hye is Mi-yeong's sister-in-law as well as a rookie policewoman who works at the same center. They team up to solve the case of a young woman committing suicide and they discover a network of young men who drug, rape and film women and then upload the videos of rape on the internet for money. As the higher ranking police officers stay idle and refuse to help, the two women, with the assistance of a female hacker, start to round up the gang on their own accord.

Cast

Main
 Ra Mi-ran as Mi-yeong
 Lee Sung-kyung as Ji-hye
Lee Re as young Ji-hye

Supporting
 Yoon Sang-hyun as Ji-chul
 Choi Soo-young as Jang-mi
 Yeom Hye-ran as Department Head
 Wi Ha-joon as Jung Woo-jun
 Joo Woo-jae as Lee Phillip
 Han Soo-hyun as Detective Kwak
 Jeon Seok-ho as Detective Oh
 Jo Byung-gyu as youngest detective, team 3 rookie
 Ahn Chang-hwan as Kang Sang-doo
 Jo Hye-joo as Soo-bin
 Park So-eun as Seo-jin
 Lee Jung-min as Chae Sook-hee
 Kang Hong-seok as Kwak Yong-suk
 Kim Do-wan as Sung Chan-yeong

Special appearances
 Ha Jung-woo as motel owner
 Ahn Jae-hong as Happy Balloons Boss
 Sung Dong-il as Team 3 leader

Production
Principal photography began on July 5, 2018, and filming wrapped up on September 27, 2018.

Release
As of August 26, 2019, the film has reached 1,628,963 total admissions grossing $11,378,225 in revenue.

Television adaptation
On October 25, 2019, CJ ENM E&M Division Marketing Chief Choi Kyung-joo announced during OCN's Thriller House event at S-Factory in Seoul that the network will adapt Miss & Mrs. Cops as a drama series. It was scheduled to air in 2020.

References

External links
 
 
 

2019 films
South Korean crime comedy films
South Korean buddy comedy films
CJ Entertainment films
2010s buddy comedy films
Films about sex crimes
2010s female buddy films
2010s buddy cop films
2010s crime comedy films
2010s South Korean films